Chala Hawa Yeu Dya is an Indian television show in the Marathi originally aired on Zee Marathi. The show opens with Nilesh Sable's topical comic monologue, then transitions into guest interviews featuring celebrity guests typically from the Marathi film and theatre industry followed by comedic sketches by recurring performers Bhalchandra Kadam, Kushal Badrike, Bharat Ganeshpure, Shreya Bugade,  Sagar Karande, Ankur Vadhave, Yogesh Shirsat, Tushar Deol, Umesh Jagtap, Snehal Shidam.

The show was started from 18 August 2014. This show was stopped first time for shooting of new season on 7 November 2017 and from 8 January 2018, the show again started with the extended title Jagbhar Chala Hawa Yeu Dya consisting of the comedian's World Tour journey, sponsored by Veena World Tours. However, third and eighth season received negative response from the audience stating that it was gaudy comedy. This show was stopped second time due to the COVID-19 pandemic on 24 March 2020 and restarted from 13 July 2020. Due to negative response and decrease in TRP, they stopped their eight season Ladies Jindabad from April 2021 without doing Finale.

Seasons

Chala Hawa Yeu Dya

Other seasons

Special episode (Sunday)
 3 March 2019 (Finale of Hou De Viral)
 16 February 2020 (Jalesh Cruise Safar)
 8 March 2020 (Finale of Shelibrity Pattern)
 8 August 2021 (Hou Dya Zingat)
 27 February 2022 (Jhund Film Special)
 1 January 2023 (Ranveer Singh Special)

Sketch comedy 
The show follows a recurring theme in the sketch comedy. The premise of the sketch is the fictional village of Thukaratwadi where host Nilesh Sable, playing himself, invites the celebrity guests at his café. Nilesh is the writer of most of these comedy sketches with improv acts by the actors. The format of the show begins with introductions of the celebrity guests that is mostly tied up with upcoming promotions of a film or theatre release. Nilesh plays himself as the owner of the café of Thukratwadi. The interview is interspersed with comedic bits that include Bharat Ganeshpure who is the Sarpanch (village chief) making formal introductions of the guests.

Cast

Chala Hawa Yeu Dya
 Nilesh Sable - He is the owner of the café of Thukaratwadi where their guests are invited.
 Bhalchandra Kadam as Pappa is Nilesh's father. He is known to confuse people's names and ends up in comedic situations as a result.
 Kushal Badrike as Nilesh's twin brother. He is a big movie buff and obsessed with pursuing acting as a career.
 Bharat Ganeshpure as Sarpanch. The Sarpanch is the traditional village chief who welcomes Nilesh's guests to Thukaratwadi. He repeatedly mispronounces names of the guests and frequently blames the writers for bad handwriting or writing in English instead of Marathi. His token gesture of welcoming guests includes gifting a flower bouquet to each guest just for the sake of the official photograph and then taking it back, citing shortage of bouquets.
 Shreya Bugade as Sarpanch's daughter. She is a close friend of Kushal's and often barges into the café with the hope of finding her Prince Charming. Shreya also plays various characters on the series.
 Sagar Karande as the Lavani queen, Postman kaka, Puneri baai.
 Vinit Bhonde as various characters.
 Manasi Naik as the neighborhood of Nilesh. 
 Priyadarshan Jadhav as the Ajoba of Nilesh.

Maharashtra Daura
 Nilesh Sable as Sadanad Buche
 Shreya Bugade as Various Characters 
 Bharat Ganeshpure as judge at celebrity courtroom trials, Prashant Amle, Vandekar Bhauji, Police Inspector
 Bhalchandra Kadam as Jyotish Baaskar, Shantabai, Daya
 Kushal Badrike as Various Characters
 Sagar Karande as the lavani queen, Postman kaka, Puneri baai
 Vinit Bhonde as Various Characters
 Ramesh Wani as Various Characters
 Shashikant Kerkar as Various Characters
 Sandeep Redkar as Various Characters

Bharat Daura
 Nilesh Sable as Host, Sadanad Buche
 Bharat Ganeshpure as Judge, Prashant Amle, Vandekar Bhauji, Police Inspector
 Bhalchandra Kadam as Jyotish Baaskar, Shantabai, Daya
 Kushal Badrike as Various Characters
 Shreya Bugade as Various Characters
 Sagar Karande as the lavani queen, Postman kaka, Puneri baai, Lawyer
 Vinit Bhonde as various characters

Jagbhar Chala Hawa Yeu Dya
 Nilesh Sable as Host, Sadanad Buche
 Bharat Ganeshpure as Judge, Prashant Amle, Vandekar Bhauji, Police Inspector
 Bhalchandra Kadam as Jyotish Baaskar, Shantabai, Daya
 Kushal Badrike as various characters
 Shreya Bugade as various characters
 Sagar Karande as the Lavani queen, Postman kaka, Puneri baai, Lawyer
 Ankur Wadhave as various characters

Hou De Viral
This is the fifth season by the show where contestants were chosen from auditions taken in different parts of Maharashtra. The top five contestants of this season are:-

 Snehal Shidam (Winner)
 Pravin Tikhe
 Dr. Pooja Sadamate-Nagral
 Arnav Kalkundri
 Gauravi Vaidya

Shelibrity Pattern
This is the sixth season by the show, where television celebrities compete with each other through performing comedy skits on stage. The top 7 contestants of this season are:

 Umesh Jagtap (Winner)
 Sharmila Shinde
 Adwait Dadarkar
 Rahul Magdum
 Abhidnya Bhave
 Raj Hanchnale
 Pravin Dalimbkar

Utsav Hasyacha
 Nilesh Sabale
 Bhalchandra Kadam
 Bharat Ganeshpure
 Kushal Badrike
 Shreya Bugade
 Sagar Karande
 Snehal Shidam
 Ankur Wadhave
 Yogesh Shirsat
 Umesh Jagtap

Ladies Jindabad
This is the eighth season by the show, where ten female celebrities are taken for contestants.

 Gayatri Datar (Winner)
 Monalisa Bagal
 Mayuri Wagh
 Suruchi Adarkar
 Sarita Mehendale-Joshi
 Purva Shinde
 Shivani Baokar
 Bhakti Ratnaparkhi
 Sanjivani Sathe
 Snehlata Tawade-Vasaikar

Awards

Reception

References

External links 
 
 Chala Hawa Yeu Dya at ZEE5

Zee Marathi original programming
Marathi-language television shows
Indian reality television series
2014 Indian television series debuts
2017 Indian television series endings
2018 Indian television series debuts